Roar Pedersen Bakke (24 November 1927 – 9 November 1989) was a Norwegian ice hockey player, born in Drammen, Norway. He played for the Norwegian national ice hockey team, and  participated at the Winter Olympics in 1952, where the Norwegian team placed 9th.

References

External links

1927 births
1989 deaths
Ice hockey players at the 1952 Winter Olympics
Norwegian ice hockey players
Olympic ice hockey players of Norway
Sportspeople from Drammen